Why Hurry (1940 – September 1964) was a British Thoroughbred racehorse and broodmare, who raced during World War II and was best known for winning the classic Oaks Stakes in 1943. After winning one minor race as a juvenile she finished fifth in the 1000 Guineas before winning the Oaks, run that year on the July Course at Newmarket Racecourse. After finishing unplaced in the St Leger she was retired from racing and had some success as a broodmare.

Background
Why Hurry was a chestnut filly, bred and owned by James Voase "Jimmy" Rank, the son of Joseph Rank and older brother of the film-maker J. Arthur Rank. Why Hurry’s sire Precipitation was a top class racehorse, best known for winning the Ascot Gold Cup in 1937. He went on to become a successful stallion, siring three other Classic winners in Airborne (Derby Stakes), Chamossaire (St Leger) and Premonition (St Leger) as well as the King George VI and Queen Elizabeth Stakes winner Supreme Court. Precipitation himself was sired by the unbeaten champion, Hurry On, making him a representative of the Godolphin Arabian sire line. Why Hurry's dam Cybiane was an Irish-bred mare who won three minor races in France before being bought for 300 guineas to become a broodmare in England. She was descended from Sacred Ibis, a half-sister of both the disqualified Derby "winner" Craganour and Nassovian who finished third in both the 2000 Guineas and the Derby. Rank sent his filly into training with Noel Cannon at his private Druid's Lodge stable on Salisbury Plain, Wiltshire.

Why Hurry's racing career took place during World War II during which horse racing in Britain was subject to many restrictions. Several major racecourses, including Epsom and Doncaster, were closed for the duration of the conflict, either for safety reasons, or because they were being used by the military. Many important races were rescheduled to new dates and venues, often at short notice, and all five of the Classics were usually run at Newmarket. Wartime austerity also meant that prize money was reduced: Why Hurry's Oaks was worth £1,956 compared to the £8,043 earned by Galatea in 1939.

Racing career

1942: two-year-old season
As a two-year-old in 1942, Why Hurry won one minor race over seven furlongs.

1943: three-year-old season
In 1943, Why Hurry contested the "New" 1000 Guineas, run on Newmarket's July course rather than its traditional home on the adjoining Rowley Mile. The race was run on 26 May, much later than its customary date in late April or early May. She finished fifth of the twelve runners behind Herringbone.

On 18 June, Why Hurry returned to the July course for the "New" Oaks over one and a half miles and started at odds of 7/1 in a field of thirteen runners. Ridden by Charlie Elliott, she won by a neck from Ribbon who had been left at the start, with Tropical Sun a length away in third and Herringbone in fourth.

In September, Why Hurry contested the "New" St Leger over one mile, six and a half furlongs on the July course and finished unplaced behind Herringbone in a field which also included Ribbon, Nasrullah and Straight Deal.

Assessment
In their book A Century of Champions, based on a modified version of the Timeform system, John Randall and Tony Morris rated Why Hurry an "inferior" winner of the Oaks.

Breeding record
Why Hurry was retired from racing to become a broodmare. She produced six minor winners from seven foals:

Conservative, a chestnut colt, foaled in 1946, sired by Orthodox
Lingering, bay filly, 1947, by Tehran
Expeditious, bay colt, 1948, by Hyperion
Dominant, bay colt, 1949, by Nearco
Expedition, colt, 1952, by Hyperion
Jaldikaro, colt, 1955, by Hindostan
June Evening, filly, 1959, by Robert Barker
Cutfast, filly, 1962, by Woodcut
Wish Me Well, colt, 1963, by Woodcut

Why Hurry did in September 1964.

Pedigree

References

1940 racehorse births
1964 racehorse deaths
Racehorses bred in the United Kingdom
Racehorses trained in the United Kingdom
Thoroughbred family 14-b
Godolphin Arabian sire line
Epsom Oaks winners